Cosmos, in comics, may refer to:

Cosmos (Transformers), a Transformer who has appeared in the comic books based on the toys
Cosmos, a Wildstorm character from Welcome to Tranquillity
Cosmos, an Image Comics character from Red Mass for Mars by Jonathan Hickman
Cosmos, a DC Comics character from Green Lantern

See also
Cosmos (disambiguation)
Kosmos (comics)

References